Earthbound may refer to:

Video games
Mother (video game series), known as EarthBound outside Japan, series of role-playing video games
Mother (video game), known as EarthBound Beginnings outside Japan, 1989 role-playing game for the Family Computer
EarthBound, 1994 role-playing video game for the Super Nintendo Entertainment System

Media
Earthbound (1920 film), from a story by Basil King
Earthbound (1940 film), starring Andrea Leeds
Earthbound (1981 film), a science fiction comedy starring Burl Ives
A Little Bit of Heaven (2011 film), formerly Earthbound
Earthbound (TV series), a Canadian current affairs television series
"Earthbound" (Space: 1999), an episode of the television series Space: 1999

Books
Earthbound (novel), a 1982 novel by Richard Matheson
Earthbound, the third novel in the Marsbound trilogy by Joe Haldeman

Music
The Earthbound, a Greek band
Earthbound (Bury Tomorrow album), 2016
Earthbound (Conner Reeves album), 1997
Earthbound (The 5th Dimension album), 1975
Earthbound (King Crimson album), 1972
Earthbound (Sophie Barker album), 2005
Earthbound, a 1998 album by Billy Mann
Earthbound, a 1993 album by the Rocket Scientists
Earthbound (EP), a 2009 EP by To-Mera
Earthbound (song), a 2003 song by Rodney Crowell